Wilson Creek is a stream in Clinton County, Ohio, in the United States.

Wilson Creek was named for Amos and Isaac Wilson, pioneer settlers.

Location
Mouth: Confluence with West Branch Rattlesnake Creek in Richland Township 
Origin: Wilson Township northwest of Sabina

Other creeks
The U.S. Geographic Names Information System (GNIS) names another Wilson Creek in Clinton County. That creek feeds into Cowan Lake southwest of Wilmington.

See also
List of rivers of Ohio

References

Rivers of Clinton County, Ohio
Rivers of Ohio